is a retired Japanese gymnast. He competed at the 1952, 1956, 1960 and 1964 Olympics and won five gold, four silver and four bronze medals. Ono was the flag bearer for Japan at the 1960 Olympics, and took the Olympic Oath at the 1964 Games. In 1998, he was inducted into the International Gymnastics Hall of Fame.

Personal life
In 1958 he married Kiyoko Ono, a fellow Olympic gymnast. They have two sons and three daughters; the first two children were born between 1961 and 1963 while both parents were actively competing.

See also

List of multiple Olympic medalists at a single Games
List of multiple Olympic medalists
List of multiple Summer Olympic medalists
List of Olympic medal leaders in men's gymnastics

References

|-

|-

1931 births
Living people
People from Noshiro, Akita
Sportspeople from Akita Prefecture
Japanese male artistic gymnasts
Gymnasts at the 1952 Summer Olympics
Gymnasts at the 1956 Summer Olympics
Gymnasts at the 1960 Summer Olympics
Gymnasts at the 1964 Summer Olympics
Olympic gold medalists for Japan
Olympic silver medalists for Japan
Olympic bronze medalists for Japan
Olympic gymnasts of Japan
Olympic medalists in gymnastics
World champion gymnasts
Medalists at the World Artistic Gymnastics Championships
Medalists at the 1964 Summer Olympics
Medalists at the 1960 Summer Olympics
Medalists at the 1956 Summer Olympics
Medalists at the 1952 Summer Olympics
Oath takers at the Olympic Games
20th-century Japanese people
21st-century Japanese people